George M. Weinstock (born February 6, 1949) is an American geneticist and microbiologist on the faculty of The Jackson Laboratory for Genomic Medicine, where he is a professor and the associate director for microbial genomics. Before joining The Jackson Laboratory, he taught at Washington University in St. Louis and served as associate director of The Genome Institute. Previously, Dr. Weinstock was co-director of the Human Genome Sequencing Center (HGSC) at Baylor College of Medicine in Houston, Texas, and Professor of Molecular and Human Genetics there.[1] He received his B.S. degree from the University of Michigan in 1970 and his Ph.D. from the Massachusetts Institute of Technology in 1977. He has spent most of his career taking genomic approaches to study fundamental biological processes.

Weinstock's parents met during the Manhattan Project in Los Alamos, New Mexico, and he grew up meeting many of the participants in the atomic bomb project and their colleagues. He performed his PhD thesis under David Botstein at MIT, studying the structure of phage P22 chromosome.

As a postdoctoral fellow with Dr. I. R. Lehman at Stanford University School of Medicine, Dr. Weinstock and Kevin McEntee discovered that the RecA protein of E. coli catalyzed strand transfer in genetic recombination. Later, as a faculty member at the University of Texas Health Science Center at Houston (UTHealth), he led one of the first bacterial genome projects, collaborating with The Institute for Genomic Research to sequence the entire genome of a bacterium, Treponema pallidum, the organism that causes syphilis. In 1999 he joined Richard Gibbs at the HGSC as one of the five main centers to work on the Human Genome Project.  The HGSC produced sequences of human chromosomes 3, 12 and X. Dr. Weinstock was a principal investigator in projects producing genome sequences for rat, mouse, macaque, bovine, sea urchin, honey bee, fruit fly and many microbial genomes, as well as one of the first personal genome projects, sequencing Dr. James Watson’s genome using next-generation sequencing technology.

He was a leader of the Human Microbiome Project, studying the collection of microbes that colonize the human body.

Awards and honors
Fellow, American Association for the Advancement of Science
Fellow, American Academy of Microbiology
Editorial Board, Genome Biology
Editorial Board, Genome Biology and Evolution
Editorial Board, BMC Genomics

References

External links
[Author] PubMed Citations
"The Next Human Genome Project: Our Microbes." Technology Review. 2 May 2007.

1949 births
Washington University in St. Louis faculty
University of Texas Health Science Center at Houston faculty
Baylor College of Medicine physicians and researchers
University of Michigan alumni
Massachusetts Institute of Technology alumni
Stanford University postdoctoral scholars
Living people
Human Genome Project scientists